Sebastián Alejandro Battaglia (born 8 November 1980) is an Argentine former footballer who played as a midfielder and manager.

He spent most of his career with Argentine club Boca Juniors, but also had a brief spell with Spanish side Villarreal. At international level, he made 10 appearances for the Argentina national team between 2003 and 2009. Battaglia has been described in his club profile as displaying good positioning, being a ball-winner and possessing good aerial ability.

Battaglia is the most decorated player in Boca Juniors' history, having won 17 titles with the club between 1998 and 2012. His last championship playing for Boca was the 2011–12 Copa Argentina.

Club career
Even though he was born in Santa Fe Province, Sebastián began his career with the Boca Juniors' reserve team. He made his professional debut on 31 May 1998, and quickly became an important player for Boca Juniors'. He played for 5 years at the club, when in the middle of the 2003–2004 season, Villarreal CF of Spain bought 50% of his contract for 2.8 million euros and acquired his services. Villarreal was considered an excellent destination for Battaglia as there were already plenty of former Boca players such as Martín Palermo, Juan Román Riquelme, Diego Cagna, Rodolfo Arruabarrena and Fabricio Coloccini at the club.

Battaglia played only a season and a half at Villareal, and never displayed the form that had made him such a hot property in Argentina. His family also had trouble adjusting to their new life in Spain. After an injury stopped him playing for almost 6 months, he decided to return with his family to Argentina. In July 2005, after some prolonged negotiations between Boca Juniors and Villarreal, he got his wish.

Back at Boca Juniors he recaptured his old form and started to improve his game, becoming club captain and being called up to the Argentina national team in the World Cup Qualifiers match against Peru on 8 October 2005. He was also a starter in the friendly match against Qatar in November of the same year.

During the 'Torneo de Verano' of 2008, Battaglia scored in the Superclásico against arch rivals River Plate, in a game where which Boca Juniors won 2–0. On 4 May 2008, in the 'Torneo Clausura' Battaglia would again score against River Plate, by heading in a goal from a corner which won Boca the game at 1–0.

On 11 December 2011, Battaglia entered the pitch as a substitute to play the last minutes of the final match of the 2011 Apertura (that Boca Juniors had already won two matches earlier), therefore being part of the title-winning squad. Thus, he became the most successful player in Boca Juniors history, with 18 trophies.

Coaching and later career
On 20 March 2018, Battaglia was appointed manager of Primera Nacional club Club Almagro, following the resignation of Alfredo Grelak. This was his first ever experience as a coach. He made his debut against the Instituto on 21 March in a 0-0 draw. Failing to secure promotion on May 11, Battaglia was fired.

A week after being fired at Almagro, Battaglia was appointed assistant coach of Julio César Falcioni at Banfield. The duo left the club at the end of 2018.

In the beginning of 2020, Battaglia was appointed manager of Boca Juniors' reserve team. In July 2021, Battaglia was named as an interim replacement for Boca Juniors manager Miguel Ángel Russo, who was in isolation together with the majority of the first team squad, after a defeat to Atletico Mineiro after a player had been tested positive. He was in charge for two games.

On 17 August 2021, Battaglia was named interim manager of Boca until December, after Russo left.

Career statistics

International

Managerial statistics

Carrera

Player
Boca Juniors
 Primera División: 1999 Cl, 2000 Ap, 2003 Ap, 2005 Ap, 2006 Cl, 2008 Ap, 2011 Ap
 Copa Libertadores: 2000, 2001, 2003, 2007
 Copa Intercontinental: 2000, 2003
 Copa Sudamericana: 2005
 Recopa Sudamericana: 2005, 2006, 2008
 Copa Argentina: 2011-12

Villarreal
 UEFA Intertoto Cup: 2004

Manager
Boca Juniors
 Copa Argentina: 2019–20
 Copa de la Liga Profesional: 2022

References

External links
 Argentine Primera statistics  
 Sebastián Battaglia at Football Lineups
 Profile at Boca Juniors' official website 
 Battaglia, Sebastián Alejandro at Historia de Boca.com 
 

1980 births
Living people
Argentine footballers
Argentine expatriate footballers
Argentina international footballers
Footballers from Santa Fe, Argentina
Association football midfielders
Argentine Primera División players
La Liga players
Boca Juniors footballers
CD Badajoz players
Villarreal CF players
Argentine expatriate sportspeople in Spain
Expatriate footballers in Spain
Argentine football managers
Almagro managers
Boca Juniors managers